Ali Omar (born 10 March 1980) is a Yemeni former footballer.

Career

Omar played for Al-Arabi in the Kuwaiti Premier League, where he participated in the AFC Champions League 2004.

References

External links

1980 births
Living people
Yemeni footballers
Yemeni expatriate footballers
Expatriate footballers in Kuwait
Yemeni expatriate sportspeople in Kuwait
Al-Arabi SC (Kuwait) players
Kuwait Premier League players
Association football forwards
Yemen international footballers